Margaret Kennedy, Marchioness of Ailsa (1772 – 5 January 1848) was a Scottish noblewoman. She was born in 1772 to John Erskine and Mary Baird. On 1 June 1793, she married Archibald Kennedy, Lord Kennedy, who the following year succeeded as 12th Earl of Cassilis. Margaret inherited the House of Dun, a Georgian house, in 1824, and achieved the rank of Marchioness when her husband was created Marquess of Ailsa in 1831. She died on 5 January 1848.

Children
 Lady Alicia Jane Kennedy (b. 2 Jul 1805 - d. 1887), married Jonathan Peel
 Archibald Kennedy, Earl of Cassilis (1794–1832), who predeceased his parents; by his wife Eleanor Allardyce, he was the father of Archibald Kennedy, 2nd Marquess of Ailsa.
 Lady Anne Kennedy (1797–1877), married Sir David Baird, 2nd Baronet
 Lady Margaret Kennedy (1800–1889), married Thomas Radclyffe-Livingstone-Eyre
 Lady Mary Kennedy (1800–1886), married Richard Oswald
 the Hon. John Kennedy-Erskine (1802–1831), who also predeceased his parents. He assumed the additional surname Erskine on being named heir to the House of Dun. He married Augusta FitzClarence, illegitimate daughter of King William IV.

Painting
Margaret Erskine of Dun is the title given to the painting by William Owen which can be found on the first floor of Culzean Castle.

References

19th-century Scottish women
1772 births
1848 deaths
Ailsa
Wives of knights